Lake Como (Cómm  or Cùmm ), also known as Lario (after the ), is a lake of glacial origin in Lombardy, Italy.

Lake Como has been a popular retreat for aristocrats and wealthy people since Roman times, and a very popular tourist attraction with many artistic and cultural gems. It has many villas and palaces such as Villa Olmo, Villa Serbelloni, and Villa Carlotta. Many famous people have had and have homes on the shores of Lake Como.

One of its particularities is its "Y" shape, which forms the "Larian Triangle", with the little town of Canzo as its capital.

In 2014, The Huffington Post called it the most beautiful lake in the world for its microclimate and environment with prestigious villas and villages.

Etymology
The lake's name in Latin is Larius, Italianized as Lario, but this name is rarely used; it is usually called Lago di Como (literally "lake of Como"). Its name comes from the city of Como, known to the Romans as Comum. In guidebooks the lake may be variously referred to as Lake Como.

Geography

The lake is shaped much like an inverted letter "Y". The northern branch begins at the town of Colico, while the towns of Como and Lecco sit at the ends of the southwestern and southeastern branches respectively. The small towns of Bellagio, Menaggio and Varenna are situated at the intersection of the three branches of the lake: a triangular boat service operates between them.

Lake Como is fed primarily by the Adda, which enters the lake near Colico and flows out at Lecco. This geological conformation makes the southwestern branch a dead end, and so Como, unlike Lecco, is often flooded.

The mountainous pre-alpine territory between the two southern arms of the lake (between Como, Bellagio, and Lecco) is known as the Larian Triangle, or Triangolo lariano. The source of the river Lambro is here. At the centre of the triangle, the town of Canzo is the seat of the Comunità montana del Triangolo lariano, an association of the 31 municipalities that represent the 71,000 inhabitants of the area.

Climate

Lake Como's climate is humid subtropical (Cfa under the Köppen climate classification system). In winter, the lake helps to maintain a higher temperature in the surrounding region. Snowfall is erratic and occurs mainly at higher elevations. Rainfall is heaviest in May and lowest during the winter months.

Tourism
As a tourist destination, Lake Como is popular for its landscapes, wildlife, and spas. It is a venue for sailing, windsurfing, and kitesurfing. In 1818 Percy Bysshe Shelley wrote to Thomas Love Peacock: "This lake exceeds anything I ever beheld in beauty, with the exception of the arbutus islands of Killarney. It is long and narrow, and has the appearance of a mighty river winding among the mountains and the forests".

In the area surrounding Lake Como there are several farms which produce goods such as honey, olive oil, cheese, milk, eggs and salamis. Visitors can find lists of these farms and typically visit the farm itself in person to make their purchases.

In 2018, the Italian luxury label Dolce and Gabbana held a fashion event on Lake Como.

Lakeside villas

The lake is well known for the attractive villas that have been built there since Roman times, when Pliny the Younger built the Comedia and the Tragedia resorts.

An Italian garden (with steps, fountains, and sculptures) was laid out at the same time. The villa was later sold to powerful banker and Napoleonic politician Giovanni Battista Sommariva. Stendhal was his guest in 1818, and his visit is recalled at the start of La Chartreuse de Parme. In 1843 it was purchased by Princess Marianne of Nassau as a wedding present for her daughter Carlotta, after whom the villa is now named. The latter, together with her husband Georg II of Saxen-Meiningen, laid out the woodland landscape park in Romantic style. The villa today includes a museum of agricultural implements as well as important works of sculpture by Sommariva's friend Antonio Canova and by Luigi Acquisti.

Villa d'Este, in Cernobbio, was built in 1568 by Cardinal Tolomeo Gallio, a native of the town. In 1816–1817 the villa was home to Caroline of Brunswick, estranged wife of the Prince of Wales and shortly to become Queen Consort of King George IV of the United Kingdom. The landscaped gardens in the English style are a product of this period. Later in the century it was turned into a luxury hotel. Today the Villa d'Este is known for attracting celebrity guests.

Villa del Balbianello, famous for its elaborate terraced gardens, lies on a promontory of the western shore of the lake near Isola Comacina. Built in 1787 on the site of a Franciscan monastery, it was the final home of the explorer Guido Monzino and today houses a museum devoted to his work.

Villa Melzi d'Eril in Bellagio was built in neo-classical style by architect Giocondo Albertolli in 1808–1810 as the summer residence of Duke Francesco Melzi d'Eril, who was vice-president of the Napoleonic Italian Republic. The park includes an orangery, a private chapel, fine statues, and a Japanese garden, and is planted, as often on lake Como, with huge rhododendrons. 19th-century guests at the Villa included Stendhal and Franz Liszt.

Villa Serbelloni, also in Bellagio, hosts the Rockefeller Foundation Bellagio Center, a  international conference center set up and managed by the Rockefeller Foundation since 1959, which also operates a "scholar-in-residence" program for scholars from around the world. This is believed to have been the site of Pliny the Younger's villa "Tragedia". Its well-known park was created at the end of the 18th century by Alessandro Serbelloni.

Many famous people have or have had homes on the shores of Lake Como, such as Matthew Bellamy, John Kerry, Madonna, George Clooney, Gianni Versace, Ronaldinho, Sylvester Stallone, Julian Lennon, Richard Branson, Ben Spies, Pierina Legnani, Lionel Messi and José Mourinho.

Ferries
The Lake Como ferry service is a highly developed public transport system linking the many small towns around the Lake. A motorized service began in 1826 when a steamship with sails, the "Lario", was launched by the newly established Società privilegiata per l'impresa dei battelli a vapore nel Regno Lombardo Veneto. Since 1952 the system has been run under the auspices of a government organization called first the Gestione Commissariale Governativa and subsequently the Gestione Governativa Navigazione Laghi, which is also responsible for services on Lake Maggiore and Lake Garda.

Today there are three main services:
 Motorship services along the western branch and northern end of the Lake (between Colico or Piona and Como town), with additional shuttles to the mid-lake area.
 Fast services that follow broadly the same route, but use faster hydrofoils, stop less frequently, and cost extra.
 Ferries that run only between the popular mid-lake villages of Menaggio, Bellagio, and Varenna, plus Cadenabbia. Some of these boats carry vehicles as well as passengers.

Sacro Monte di Ossuccio

The Sacro Monte di Ossuccio ("Holy Mount of Ossuccio") is a sanctuary located on a hillside slope between olive groves and woods along the western edge of Lake Como facing Isola Comacina. Fifteen Baroque inspired chapels, built between 1635 and 1710, and dedicated to the Mysteries of the Rosary are dotted along the way that leads to the Monastery. This building is the last in the chain and is dedicated to the Coronation of the Virgin.

In 2003, the Sacri Monti of Piedmont and Lombardy, including that of Ossuccio, were added by UNESCO to the World Heritage List.

Villages, resorts, and other notable localities near the lake

In literature and the arts
 Letitia Elizabeth Landon's poem The Lake of Como was published in Fisher's Drawing Room Scrap Book, 1837. It illustrates a painting by Samuel Prout, engraved by William Miller.

Gallery

Notes

Footnotes

References

 
 Macadam, Alta (1997). Blue Guide. Northern Italy: From the Alps to Bologna. London: A & C Black. .
 Villacarlotta.it, Villa Carlotta
Online camera Como

LComo
Glacial lakes of Italy
Lakes of Lombardy
Province of Como
Province of Lecco
Rockefeller Foundation
Subalpine lakes of Italy
Waterways of Italy